Maurizio Nassi (born January 3, 1977 in Taormina) is an Italian footballer who plays as a striker for U.S. Alessandria Calcio 1912.

On 31 August 2007, his contract was extended for one year.

References

1977 births
Living people
Italian footballers
Brescia Calcio players
A.C. Ancona players
Mantova 1911 players
Reggina 1914 players
S.S. Virtus Lanciano 1924 players
Calcio Padova players
S.S.C. Napoli players
U.S. Alessandria Calcio 1912 players
Association football forwards